"Into You Like a Train" is the sixth episode of the second season of the American television medical drama Grey's Anatomy, and the show's fifteenth episode overall. The episode, which would have originally served as the season two premiere, was written by Krista Vernoff and directed by Jeff Melman. The episode was originally broadcast on the American Broadcasting Company (ABC) in the United States on October 30, 2005. Vernoff received an Emmy nomination for Outstanding Writing for a Drama Series. The episode's title refers to a song by The Psychedelic Furs from their Talk Talk Talk album. The track was also covered by the band Jawbreaker as bonus track for their Dear You album 2004 reissue.

Plot
As Meredith Grey nervously awaits a final decision from Derek, her fear is interrupted when a train crash brings several seriously injured patients to the hospital, including Bonnie and Tom, a pair of passengers who have been impaled on a metal pole. The only way to remove the pole from these two is a very risky surgery where one of the two must be slid back on the pole, more than likely causing them to die. Tom, an older man in his 50s, offers to give his life to save Bonnie because he is older and has had a shot at living. Bonnie, an attractive woman in her late 20s, is engaged to be married and waiting for her fiancé to arrive at the hospital. Since Bonnie's injuries are determined to be worse than Tom's, she is the one chosen to be moved on the pole. All the doctors involved in the surgery promise they will do everything they can to try and save both Bonnie and Tom. In surgery, after being removed from the pole, Bonnie begins to crash. Doctors work on her only for a short time before they deem her "unsavable" and turn to help Tom, who has a greater chance of living.  As the doctors move to Tom, Meredith stays by the dying Bonnie saying "What about her? We can't just abandon her!" This particular situation parallels Meredith's situation with Derek. She feels that she has just been dropped when Derek returns to his unfaithful wife. At the emergency department, Alex is doing sutures but eventually fails to notice a woman bleeding internally which leads to her death. In the meantime, Addison Shepherd sees great potential in Izzie, who must decide whether her loyalty as Meredith’s friend outweighs professional gain.

Music
"Blood and Peanut Butter" – B.C. Camplight
"Back Where I Was" – The Hereafter
"The City Lights" – Umbrellas
"Today Has Been Okay" – Emilíana Torrini

Reception
The episode received universal acclaim at its initial airing and critics have referred to it as the best episode of the show at numerous occasions.

The A.V. Club included "Into You Like a Train" on its list of the best TV episodes of the decade in November 2009, noting that in this episode "the show turned melodramatic excess into great, goofy fun."

Variety listed the episode in its Top 10 most bizarre medical maladies encountered in the series.

Outside the US, the episode also received high acclaim.

Indielondon wrote, "What makes "Into You Like a Train" such a compelling episode is the way it manipulates your emotions – you’ll laugh, cry and feel like screaming at the TV." and added that, "There’s no denying the brilliance of the episode. It’s provocative viewing that forces you to have an opinion whilst becoming emotionally involved with its characters. You’ll love and hate it in equal measure – and that can only be a good thing!"

The reviews remained highly positive with time and the episode has been referred to as one of the best of the show numerous times.

Later in 2013, The A.V. Club again reaffirmed the episode as "the best single episode the show ever produced"

Due to highly positive fan reception, Monica Keena would return again as Bonnie Crasnoff, despite her character's death, in Season 3, Episode 17, "Some Kind of Miracle," as a ghost while Meredith Grey was in limbo.

References

External links
 

2005 American television episodes
Grey's Anatomy (season 2) episodes
Television episodes directed by Jeff Melman